Pool B of the 2021 Billie Jean King Cup Europe/Africa Group III was one of six pools in the Europe/Africa Group III of the 2020–21 Billie Jean King Cup. Three teams competed in a round robin competition, with the top team and bottom teams proceeding to their respective section of the play-offs: the top team played for advancement to Group II.

Standings 

Standings are determined by: 1. number of wins; 2. if two teams have the same number of wins, head-to-head record; 3. if three teams have the same number of wins, (a) number of matches won in the group, then (b) percentage of sets won in the group, then (c) percentage of games won in the group, then (d) Billie Jean King Cup rankings.

Round robin

Cyprus vs. Rwanda

Bosnia and Herzegovina vs. Rwanda

Cyprus vs. Bosnia and Herzegovina

See also
Billie Jean King Cup structure

References

External links
 Billie Jean King Cup website

A3